M. Annamalai may refer to:

 M. Annamalai (politician), Indian politician
 M. Annamalai (scientist) (born 1948), Indian space scientist